Nemíž is a village and administrative part of Tehov in Benešov District in the Central Bohemian Region of the Czech Republic. It has about 50 inhabitants.

History
Until 1900, Nemíž was part of the Ctiboř municipality. From 1900 to 1985, it was an independent municipality. From 1986 to 1990, Nemíž belonged to Vlašim. After another period between 1990 and 2008, when it was an independent municipality, it was finally annexed to Tehov in 2009.

References

Neighbourhoods in the Czech Republic
Villages in Benešov District